Rose Bay ferry wharf is located on the southern side of Sydney Harbour serving the Sydney suburb of Rose Bay.

History
On 23 March 1970, Stannard Brothers commenced operating a service to Circular Quay. On the same date its Mosman to Double Bay service was rerouted to Rose Bay. The former is now operated by Sydney Ferries, while the latter which primarily operated to service private schools in the area and was being operated by Rosman Ferries ceased in December 2003 after the State Government withdrew funding.

In September 2012, a new wharf opened to the east with the older wharf retained for other craft to use.

Services
Rose Bay wharf is served by Sydney Ferries Watsons Bay services.

My Fast Ferry operates Sydney Harbour tourist services via Rose Bay.

Interchanges
Transdev John Holland operates three routes via New South Head Road:
323: Circular Quay to Dover Heights
324: Circular Quay to Watsons Bay via Vaucluse
325: Circular Quay to Watsons Bay via Nielsen Park

References

External links

Rose Bay Wharf at Transport for NSW
Rose Bay Local Area Map Transport for NSW

Ferry wharves in Sydney
Rose Bay, New South Wales